Selim Kaabi (born 27 July 1984) is a French association footballer currently contracted to Etoile FC in the Singapore S.League. He plays as a defender.

Career
Before signing with the Clementi Stars, Kaabi played for the now defunct Torredonjimeno CF in the Spanish fourth division, as well as clubs in Belgium and Finland.

Kaabi made his debut for the Clementi Stars in the opening round 0-0 draw with Balestier Khalsa. A week later, he opened his scoring account for the club, in the 2-0 victory over Geylang United in which he also picked up a booking.

References

External links
 

Living people
1991 births
French footballers
Expatriate footballers in Singapore
Association football defenders
Étoile FC players